Al-Fatur was a Palestinian Arab village in the District of Baysan. It was depopulated during the 1947–1948 Civil War in Mandatory Palestine on May 12, 1948. It was located 11.5 km south of Baysan.
The village was attacked by the Israel Defense Forces as part of Operation Gideon.

History 
In 1881  E.H. Palmer reported "rocks and a spring" at El Fâtûr.

British Mandate of Palestine ers  
In the  1931 census of Palestine, conducted by the  Mandatory Palestine authorities, Arab el-Fatur had a population of  66, all  Muslims, in 16 houses.

In  the  1945 statistics, the population was 110 Muslims, with a total of 729 dunams of land.  Of this, 709  dunams were for cereals, while 20 were non-cultivable land.

Tirat Zvi, established in 1938,  is located north of village land, while Mechola (198/196), founded in 1968, is some 5 km southwest of the site of Al-Fatur, and uses some of its lands.

References

Bibliography

External links
 Welcome To al-Fatur
al-Fatur, Zochrot
Survey of Western Palestine, Map 12:   IAA, Wikimedia commons

Arab villages depopulated during the 1948 Arab–Israeli War